Blue Belle, also known as Annie, is a 1976 drama film directed by Massimo Dallamano and starring Annie Belle, Felicity Devonshire, and Maria Rohm. Its Italian title is Fine dell'innocenza.

Premise
A young woman meets up with her older lover after she leaves school.

Cast
 Annie Belle - Annie
 Felicity Devonshire - Linda 
 Ciro Ippolito - Angelo 
 Charles Fawcett - Michael 
 Al Cliver - Philip 
 Maria Rohm - Susan 
 Linda Ho - Genevieve 
 Yao Lin Chen - Chen 
 Rik Battaglia - Superintendent 
 Ines Pellegrini - Sarah 
 Linda Slade - Caroline 
 Tim Street - Harry 
 Ted Thomas - George 
 Patrizia Banti - Su

References

External links
 
 

1976 films
1970s coming-of-age drama films
1970s English-language films
Films directed by Massimo Dallamano
British coming-of-age drama films
Italian coming-of-age drama films
Films produced by Fulvio Lucisano
Films scored by Fabio Frizzi
1976 drama films
1970s British films
1970s Italian films